San Paolo alle Tre Fontane (Italian), in English "St Paul at the Three Fountains" is a Roman Catholic church dedicated to St Paul the Apostle, at the presumed site of his martyrdom in Rome. In Latin it is known as Sancti Pauli ad Aquas Salvias ("St Paul at Aquae Salviae"). The church located on the grounds of the Tre Fontane Abbey located on Via di Acque Salvie 1 in the Quartiere Ardeatino (Q. XX.).

Since 2010 the church is a cardinalatial diaconia, with Mauro Piacenza as its cardinal deacon.

History

Legend relates that when St Paul was decapitated, his head bounced three times and fountains miraculously sprang up at each place where it touched the ground. However, the springs, called the Aquae Salviae, as in the Latin name for the church, were known in pre-Christian times, and excavations have revealed ancient mosaic pavements.

The first church here was built in the 5th century. It was rebuilt in 1599 by Giacomo della Porta under the patronage of Cardinal Pietro Aldobrandini. The church belongs to the Trappist Tre Fontane Abbey, and is one of three churches on the grounds, along with Santa Maria Scala Coeli and Santi Vincenzo e Anastasio.

There are three symbolic monumental covers to the fountains said to have sprung up at St Paul's death. The fountains were sealed in 1950 because pollution made it dangerous to drink the water.

A column in the church is said to be the one to which St Paul was bound when he was beheaded, but this seems to be a late story and it is probably just a column from Roman ruins nearby. An original Crucifixion canvas by Guido Reni was previously found in the church, it is now located in the Vatican, and replaced by a copy. A chapel on the right has a Decapitation of St Paul by Bartolomeo Passerotti. The church contains polychrome marble including some porphyry columns. The statues on the facade were made by Niccolo Cordieri.

Remains of a late Roman mosaic floor are preserved in the nave. It was donated to the church by Pope Pius IX and is said to have been brought here from Ostia, Rome's port in the imperial period.

The 2010 appointment of Cardinal Mauro Piacenza as Cardinal-Deacon of this ancient church marks its first use as a cardinalatial diaconia.

Cardinal Piacenza is said to have made the request for this to be his titular church because he has a long association with and strong devotion to Our Lady of Revelation – a shrine and pilgrimage site across the road from the Tre Fontane Church.

References

External links

 Italian site with photographs

Paolo Tre Fontane
Paolo Tre Fontane
Roman Catholic churches completed in 1599
Paolo Tre Fontane
Rome Q. XX Ardeatino
1599 establishments in Italy

ta:மூன்று ஊற்று புனித பவுல் கோவில்